Dr. Nobin Bordoloi College, established in 1986, is a general degree college situated at Dhekiajuli, in Jorhat district, Assam. This college is affiliated with the Dibrugarh University. This college offers bachelor's degree courses in arts.

References

Universities and colleges in Assam
Colleges affiliated to Dibrugarh University
Educational institutions established in 1986
1986 establishments in Assam